Antonio Rago (born November 5, 1990) is a former Canadian soccer player.

Career

Youth and college
Rago played at the University of Alberta's Green & Gold Soccer Academy under head coach Len Vickery, before joining the Vancouver Whitecaps residency program in July 2007. He went on to play with the Vancouver Whitecaps Residency team in the USL Premier Development League, while training with the senior Whitecaps side.

Professional
Rago played professional indoor soccer for the Edmonton Drillers in the Canadian Major Indoor Soccer League in 2010, before being signed by FC Edmonton of the new North American Soccer League in 2011. He made his professional debut in the team's first competitive game on April 9, 2011, a 2–1 victory over the Fort Lauderdale Strikers. The club re-signed Rago for the 2012 season on October 12, 2011.

International
Rago, played for the Canadian U-17 national team in 2006 and 2007, scoring a goal in a friendly victory against Northern Ireland in the Ballymena International Tournament, and competing in the 2007 Chivas Cup in Guadalajara, Mexico.

References

External links
 FC Edmonton bio

1990 births
Canada men's youth international soccer players
Canadian soccer players
FC Edmonton players
Living people
North American Soccer League players
Soccer people from Alberta
Sportspeople from St. Albert, Alberta
USL League Two players
Vancouver Whitecaps Residency players
Association football defenders